Jonas Karlström is a Swedish actor born 3 October 1978 in Karlskrona.

About
Jonas Karlström was born in Karlskrona in Blekinge and studied acting at Fridhem's People's University in Svalöv. Living in Malmö he is a freelancing and freewheeling actor currently on a tour with a children’s play in his home county of Blekinge, a play he wrote himself. He has taken part in several theatre plays and independent films, such as The Island (not the Michael Bay film), Dödssyndaren and Shit the same. In 2006 he played one of the leads in Frostbite, the first Swedish vampire film of all time. He also played a part in Måns Mårlind's Snapphanar. In 2011 he appeared in the war film Beyond the Border.

Filmography

2006 - Frostbite
2006 - Snapphanar
2007 - Predikanten
2007 - Stenhuggaren
2007 - Olycksfågeln
2011 - Beyond the Border
2011 - Irene Huss - Den som vakar i mörkret

References

External links

Living people
1978 births
Swedish male film actors
Swedish male stage actors
People from Karlskrona